Ali Asaria is a Canadian businessman and software developer, known for founding Tulip and Well.ca, and for developing the Brick Breaker game for BlackBerry. In 2017, he created the Tulip Foundation with a pledge to donate 80% of his shares to charity.

References 

Living people
Year of birth missing (living people)